Platycheirus nielseni is a Holarctic species of hoverfly.

Description
External images
For terms see Morphology of Diptera Tibiae 2 uniformly broadened from base towards apex then becoming smaller and then swelling strongly on apical 1/5.

Distribution
Palearctic Fennoscandia South to northern France (Vosges).Ireland Eastwards through Northern Europe and Central Europe, northern Italy to EuropeanRussia; Siberia Nearctic Alaska through Canada and South through the Rocky mountains to Colorado.

References

Diptera of Europe
Diptera of North America
Syrphinae
Insects described in 1990